Fingal County Council is the authority responsible for local government in the county of Fingal, Ireland. It is one of three local authorities that comprised the former Dublin County Council before its abolition on 1 January 1994 and is one of four local authorities in County Dublin. As a county council, it is governed by the Local Government Act 2001. The council is responsible for housing and community, roads and transport, urban planning and development, amenity and culture, and environment. The council has 40 elected members. Elections are held every five years and are by single transferable vote. The head of the council has the title of Mayor. The county administration is headed by a Chief Executive, AnnMarie Farrelly. The county town is Swords.

History
Fingal County Council came into being on 1 January 1994.

The county council initially met at the former offices of the abolished Dublin County Council, an office block at 46-49 O'Connell Street, Dublin. A new building, known as County Hall, located on Main Street in Swords, was purpose-built for the county council and completed in 2000.

Administrative area
The county of Fingal covers an area of 456 km2 and has 88 km of coastline stretching from Sutton in the south to Balbriggan in the north. It is drained by the Delvin River along its northern boundary, the Ballyboghil River and the Broadmeadow River and its major tributary, the Ward in the centre, and the Tolka and Santry rivers to the south. The River Liffey forms its southern border with South Dublin. There are three large protected estuaries and salt marsh habitats, with thirteen major beaches. Howth Head and the Liffey Valley are covered by Special Area Amenity Orders.

Local electoral areas
Fingal County Council has 40 seats, divided into the following seven local electoral areas, defined by electoral divisions.

Councillors

2019 seats summary

Councillors by electoral area
This list reflects the order in which councillors were elected on 24 May 2019.

Notes

Co-options

Governance
The Mayor and Deputy Mayor are chosen from among the Councillors. The Chief Executive – AnnMarie Farrelly – is appointed by central government

References

External links

Local government in County Dublin
County councils in the Republic of Ireland
Politics of Fingal